Dominic Zwerger (born July 16, 1996) is an Austrian professional ice hockey player. He is currently playing for the HC Ambrì-Piotta in the Swiss National League (NL).

Playing career
Zwerger played as a youth in Austria and Switzerland, before leaving the junior club of HC Davos after he was selected by the Spokane Chiefs of the Western Hockey League in the second round (106th overall) of the 2013 CHL Import Draft.

Undrafted after four seasons in the WHL with the Chiefs and Everett Silvertips, Zwerger returned to Switzerland, making his professional debut with HC Ambrì-Piotta in the 2017–18 season.

Career statistics

Regular season and playoffs

International

References

External links 

1996 births
Living people
HC Ambrì-Piotta players
Austrian ice hockey left wingers
Everett Silvertips players
People from Dornbirn
Spokane Chiefs players
Sportspeople from Vorarlberg
Ice hockey players at the 2012 Winter Youth Olympics